Glutamyl aminopeptidase (aminopeptidase A, aspartate aminopeptidase, angiotensinase A, glutamyl peptidase, Ca2+-activated glutamate aminopeptidase, membrane aminopeptidase II, antigen BP-1/6C3 of mouse B lymphocytes, L-aspartate aminopeptidase, angiotensinase A2) is an enzyme encoded by the  gene. Glutamyl aminopeptidase has also recently been designated CD249 (cluster of differentiation 249).

Glutamyl aminopeptidase is a zinc-dependent membrane-bound aminopeptidase that catalyzes the cleavage of glutamatic and aspartatic amino acid residues from the N-terminus of polypeptides. The enzyme degrades vasoconstricting angiotensin II into angiotensin III and therefore helps to regulate blood pressure.

References

External links
 The MEROPS online database for peptidases and their inhibitors: M01.003
 

Clusters of differentiation
Zinc enzymes